Olzhas Bakytzhanuly Kerimzhanov (Oljas Baqytjanūly Kerımjanov; born 16 May 1989) is a Kazakhstani professional footballer who plays for Turan.

International
He was first called up to Kazakhstan national football team in June 2019 for games against Belgium and San Marino, but remained on the bench. He made his debut on 13 October 2019 in a Euro 2020 qualifier against Belgium. He started the game and played the whole game as Kazakhstan lost 0–2.

References

External links
 
 

1989 births
People from Jambyl Region
Living people
Kazakhstani footballers
Kazakhstan international footballers
Association football defenders
FC Kairat players
FC Astana players
FC Okzhetpes players
FC Kaisar players
FC Zhetysu players
FC Turan players
Kazakhstan Premier League players